Trenck is a 1932 German historical film directed by Ernst Neubach and Heinz Paul starring Hans Stüwe, Dorothea Wieck, and Olga Tschechowa. The film was based on a novel by Bruno Frank. It was shot at the Johannisthal Studios with sets designed by the art director Erich Czerwonski. It depicts the life of the Eighteenth century adventurer Friedrich von der Trenck.

Cast

References

Bibliography

External links
 

1932 films
Films of the Weimar Republic
German historical adventure films
German biographical films
1930s historical adventure films
1930s biographical films
1930s German-language films
Films directed by Heinz Paul
Films set in the 18th century
Prussian films
Cultural depictions of Voltaire
German black-and-white films
1930s German films
Films shot at Johannisthal Studios